Fireman Glacier is a glacier in the western part of the Quartermain Mountains, Victoria Land, Antarctica, flowing northwest into Cassidy Glacier. It was named in 1992 by the Advisory Committee on Antarctic Names after Edward L. Fireman (died 1990), a physicist at the Smithsonian Astrophysical Observatory, Cambridge, Massachusetts. He was an authority on the analysis and dating of extraterrestrial materials and space debris, and from 1979 conducted investigations on the dating and composition of Antarctic meteorites and Antarctic ice samples, including deep core ice obtained at Byrd Station.

References 

Glaciers of Victoria Land
Scott Coast